Posada, also previously known as Feronia or Pausata, is a comune (municipality) in the Province of Nuoro in the Italian region Sardinia. The city sits on the coast of the Tyrrhenian Sea.

Posada borders the following municipalities: Budoni, Siniscola and Torpè.

History

Within Posada's territory was the ancient city of Feronia or Pheronia, the foundation of which is ascribed to the Faliscans, which contained a now lost temple to the Etruscan goddess Feronia.

During the Roman period, the town's importance declined with the foundation of nearby Portus Luguidonis.

In the Middle Ages, Posada was main town of an historical district called Baronia di Posada or Baronia Alta (to be distinguished from Baronia Bassa or Baronia di Orosei/Galtelli'), on the Tyrrhenian coast of the island.

The ancient part of the town is in a spectacular position on the top of a hill, where it preserves a particular medieval historical center, with ruins of a castle (Castello della Fava) and a square panoramic tower of the 13th century.

The castle has been the equivalent of a holiday residence for the Giudichessa Eleanor of Arborea, and was object of alternate possession by the Giudicato d'Arborea and the Aragon, during the long fight before the Spanish conquest.

The castle became then the seat of the Baron of Posada, a title and a fief created in 1431 for Don Nicolò Carroz and formally ended in 1856, when it was finally bought by the kingdom of Sardinia (the last one of all Sardinian fiefs).

Economy
Tourism in Posada is the main economic activity.

References

External links 

 Official regional website in Italian
 Official regional website in English
 Webzine about Sardinia
 Tourist information for Sardinia
 Photo from Posada